Police State is a 1989 Australian television film about the Fitzgerald Inquiry.

References

External links
Police State at Australian Screen Online

1989 television films
1989 films
Australian drama television films
Australian docudrama films
Films directed by Chris Noonan
1980s English-language films